Elijah Qualls (born February 11, 1995) is an American football nose tackle who is a free agent. He played college football at the University of Washington.

Early years
Qualls attended Casa Grande High School in Petaluma, California. He played defensive tackle, center and running back. The California native was a prized recruit, and ran for over 1,800 yards and 23 scores in his final two years in high school. He committed to the University of Washington to play college football.

College career
After redshirting his first year at Washington in 2013, Qualls played in all 14 games in 2014, recording 13 tackles. In 2015, he played in 10 games with eight starts and had 26 tackles and 4.5 sacks. As a junior in 2016, he was named first-team All-Pac-12 after recording 38 tackles and three sacks. After the season, Qualls decided to forgo his senior year and enter the 2017 NFL Draft.

Professional career

Philadelphia Eagles
The Philadelphia Eagles selected Qualls in the sixth round (214th overall) of the 2017 NFL Draft. On May 11, the Eagles signed Qualls to a four-year, $2.52 million contract with a signing bonus of $127,204. Qualls ended his rookie season with a Super Bowl ring after the Eagles defeated the New England Patriots 41-33 in Super Bowl LII.

On September 1, 2018, Qualls was waived by the Eagles.

Carolina Panthers
On December 20, 2018, Qualls was signed to the Carolina Panthers practice squad. He signed a reserve/future contract with the Panthers on December 31, 2018. He was waived on July 24, 2019.

Baltimore Ravens
On August 10, 2019, Qualls was signed by the Baltimore Ravens, but was waived five days later.

Tampa Bay Buccaneers
On August 19, 2019, Qualls signed with the Tampa Bay Buccaneers. He was waived during final roster cuts on August 30, 2019.

DC Defenders
In October 2019, Qualls was drafted by the DC Defenders in the third round of the 2020 XFL Draft. He had his contract terminated when the league suspended operations on April 10, 2020.

New York Giants
On August 11, 2021, Qualls signed with the New York Giants. He was waived on August 31, 2021.

B.C. Lions 
Qualls signed with the BC Lions of the Canadian Football League (CFL) on April 21, 2022.

Houston Roughnecks
On November 17, 2022, Qualls was drafted by the Houston Roughnecks of the XFL.

References

External links
Philadelphia Eagles profile
 Washington Huskies bio

1995 births
American football defensive tackles
Baltimore Ravens players
BC Lions players
Carolina Panthers players
DC Defenders players
Houston Roughnecks players
Living people
New York Giants players
People from Petaluma, California
Philadelphia Eagles players
Players of American football from California
Sportspeople from the San Francisco Bay Area
Tampa Bay Buccaneers players
The Spring League players
Washington Huskies football players